Aguas Verdes is a district in the Zarumilla Province of the Tumbes Region in northwestern Peru. Its capital is the town of Aguas Verdes, which is on the banks of the Zarumilla River.
Located on the border with Ecuador, Aguas Verdes serves as the largest international point of entry in Peru's northern border. This district is located right across the river from the Ecuadorian town of Huaquillas.

Officially established as a district on January 11, 1985, its current mayor is José Llatance Fernández.

Geography
The district has a total land area of 46.06 km2. Its capital is located 7 meters above sea level.

Boundaries
 North and West: Zarumilla District
 East: Huaquillas Canton (Ecuador)
 South: Papayal District

Demographics
According to a 2002 estimate by the INEI, the district has 12,789 inhabitants and a population density of 277.7 persons/km2. In 1999, there were 2,505 households in the district.

Towns and other settlements
 Aguas Verdes
 Cuchareta Alta
 Cuchareta Baja
 El Canario
 El Salitral
 La Curva
 Loma Saavedra
 Nueva Esperanza
 Pocitos

References

External links

 Municipal web site